is a Japanese manga series written and illustrated by Tsutomu Takahashi. It was serialized in Shueisha's seinen manga magazine Weekly Young Jump from November 2011 to August 2013, with its chapters collected in eight tankōbon volumes.

Plot
Hito Hitori Futari follows the story of the Japanese Prime Minister, Kasuga Soichiro, and his guardian spirit, Riyon, as they struggle to survive in the world of Japanese politics.

Publication
Written and illustrated by Tsutomu Takahashi, Hito Hitori Futari was serialized in Shueisha's seinen manga magazine Weekly Young Jump from November 2, 2011, to August 1, 2013. Shueisha collected its chapters in eight tankōbon volumes, released from February 17, 2012, to September 19, 2013.

The manga was licensed in France by Panini.

Volume list

References

Seinen manga
Shueisha manga
Supernatural anime and manga